Xóchitl Gálvez Ruiz (born 22 February 1963) is a Mexican engineer, businesswoman and politician. Since 2018, she has served as a Senator of the LXIV Legislature of the Mexican Congress by principle of proportional representation. She belongs to the National Action Party.

Early years
Gálvez was born on 22 February 1963 in Tepatepec, Hidalgo. She studied computer engineering at the National Autonomous University of Mexico. From 2000 to 2006, she was head of the National Institute of Indigenous Peoples, during the Vicente Fox administration.

In the 2010 Hidalgo state elections, she was a candidate for governor of the state for the coalition "Hidalgo unites us", made up of the National Action Party (PAN), the Party of the Democratic Revolution (PRD), the Labor Party (PT) and Convergencia. Gálvez came in second place, with 47% of the votes in her favor.

Political career

Mayor of Miguel Hidalgo
In the 2015 Federal District elections, Gálvez was a candidate for mayor of Miguel Hidalgo for the National Action Party. She won the elections with 32% of the votes in her favor. She served from 1 October 2015 to 15 March 2018.

Senator of the Republic
In the 2018 federal elections, Gálvez ran as Senator for Mexico City for the "Por México al Frente" coalition in conjunction with Emilio Álvarez Icaza. In addition, on the national list, she was nominated as a Senator by the Party of the Democratic Revolution. After the elections, she obtained the seat as Senator by proportional representation. Since 1 September 2018, she has been a member of the LXIV legislature of the Congress of the Union as a member of the National Action Party.

On 29 April 2021, Gálvez announced she was switching from the National Action Party to the Party of the Democratic Revolution to guarantee that the party complies with the requirement of having at least five representatives in the Senate in order to be considered a parliamentary group.

References

1963 births
Living people
Politicians from Hidalgo (state)
Women members of the Chamber of Deputies (Mexico)
Members of the Chamber of Deputies (Mexico)
National Action Party (Mexico) politicians
Party of the Democratic Revolution politicians
21st-century Mexican politicians
21st-century Mexican women politicians
Senators of the LXIV and LXV Legislatures of Mexico
National Autonomous University of Mexico alumni
Women members of the Senate of the Republic (Mexico)